This is a list of locales in Hudson County, New Jersey categorized by origin of their name.

Municipalities 

Bayonne (Bynne)
Jersey City (JC)
Hoboken (Hbkn)
Union City (UC)
West New York (WNY)
Guttenberg (Gtbg)
Secaucus (Sec)
Kearny (Kearny)
Harrison (Har'sn)
East Newark (EN)
North Bergen (NB)
Weehawken (Whkn)

Lenape
The Lenape people who lived in the region spoke an Algonquian language from which the current names are derivative through Dutch and English.

Dutch
New Netherlanders established a factorij in 1617 at Communipaw, a patroonship in 1630 at Pavonia, and  New Jersey's first independent gemeente, or municipality, in 1661 as Bergen.

Odonyms
Places bearing eponymous names.(Streets with names of US presidents, more than half of whom are honored, are not included.)

See also
Toponymy of Bergen, New Netherland
List of New Jersey county name etymologies

References

Streets in Hudson County, New Jersey
History of Jersey City, New Jersey
Lists of United States placename etymology
New Jersey geography-related lists